"Tech Triumph" is the fight song of Virginia Tech.  It was composed in 1919 by Wilfred Pete Maddux (class of 1920) and Mattie Eppes (Boggs).

The song is noted for beginning with the opening notes of Reveille — a nod to Tech's past as an all-male military school.

Composers
Wilfred Preston ("Pete") Maddux, a trombone and baritone player in the Virginia Tech Regimental Band (member of the band from the Fall of 1917 to 1919), jointly composed "Tech Triumph" in 1919 along with Mattie Walton Eppes (Boggs). Mattie Eppes was a neighbor of Pete in his hometown of Blackstone, Virginia. When he was home, Pete would often play violin with Mattie accompanying him on the piano. One evening in the summer of 1919, Pete asked her to help him compose a fight song for VPI. She played the tune and Pete wrote out the score and the words for two verses in a single evening. Pete Maddux is not listed in the yearbook with the band after 1919. Miss Eppes later married John C. Boggs, Superintendent of Randolph-Macon Military Academy.

First performance
The song was first performed on Saturday, November 1, 1919, before the football game between V.P.I. and Washington and Lee University. The issue of the university newspaper noted:

In a letter to The Virginia Tech published on Dec. 10, 1919, Maddux expressed his appreciation to the student body.

To the Editor of "The Va. Tech,"
Blacksburg, Virginia
Dear Billy [Virginia Tech editor William Clift]

May I take this means of asking you to express through the columns of "The Tech" my sincere appreciation for the generous way in which the Corps received our new song. It is needless to say that the hearty approval of the student body makes me fell highly pleased, for I am quite sure that those who love their Alma Mater are as eager as I am to see the song become more popularly distributed.

While, of course, every one realizes that I expect to benefit financially through the publication of "Tech Triumph", I want every body to know that it is mainly my devotion and love to the college, which I am proud to boast as my Alma Mater, that prompted me to write the song and it is for the sake of "Tech" that I want it to receive a wide circulation. It is more than gratifying to me to see the ardent spirit and loyalty which the Corps manifests when every man lends his lusty voice to swell the chorus of football singing.

You may be interested to know that the college has approved the song officially and a large number of copies will be sent out by the college to high schools throughout the state as an advertisement of the spirit of "Tech." If I will not be presuming too much upon your kindness, may I ask that you help boost the song through "The Virginia Tech," and furthermore that you encourage the men of V.P.I. to join us in spreading our song around the country until V.P.I. will be known throughout the South and the country at large.

Thanking you again for your cooperation in making the publication of "Tech Triumph" a success, ::I am

Yours very cordially,
W.P. Maddux

Other uses
A strain of the Bliss Triumph potato developed for its disease resistance by Virginia Tech researchers in 1926 and was named Tech Triumph.

See also
Highty-Tighties
Marching Virginians

References

American college songs
College fight songs in the United States
Atlantic Coast Conference fight songs
Virginia Tech music
1919 songs